Niclas Larsen is a Danish Muay Thai fighter and kickboxer. As of October 20, 2022, he is ranked #5 in the ONE Featherweight Muay Thai rankings.

Career
Larsen was scheduled to face Leo Bonniger at The Champions Club 10 in Hamburg, Germany for the WKU World Muay Thai middleweight title on April 27, 2013. He won the fight by decision after five round and captured the title.

On May 19, 2013, Lasrsen faced Yassine Cherkaoui at Arena Fight 25. He won the fight by doctor stoppage in the second round.

Larsen was called to replace Sanny Dahlbeck in a fight against Andy Ristie at Glory 10: Los Angeles - Middleweight World Championship Tournament in Ontario, California on September 28, 2013. He lost the fight via unanimous decision.

Larsen was set to fight Steve Moxon at Glory 15: Istanbul on 12 April 2014. He won the fight via second-round TKO.

In 2016 Larsen contracted a staph infection to the leg which had him close to amputation and made him unable to compete for a year. Larsen made his return to competition on February 24, 2017, at Glory 38: Chicago with a unanimous decision victory over Lukasz Plawecki.

Larsen faced Marouan Toutouh at Kunlun Fight 75 in the opening round of the 2018 Kunlun Fight MAX tournament. He lost the fight by unanimous decision.

Larsen was called to replace Liam Nolan on short notice to face Youssef Boughanem for the WBC Muay Thai World middleweight title at PSM Fight Night on July 17, 2022. Boughanem defeated Larsen by unanimous decision to retain the WBC Muay Thai middleweight title, as well as capture the WBC Muay Thai Diamond middleweight championship.

On December 12, 2020, Larsen faced Carsten Ringer for the IMC World Super Welterweight title. He won the fight by knockout in the third round.

On December 11, 2021, Larsen faced Valentin Thibaut for the vacant WBC Muay Thai World Super Welterweight title. He won the fight by unanimous decision to become the new champion.

Larsen faced Tawanchai P.K. Saenchaimuaythaigym at ONE 158 on June 3, 2022. He lost the bout by knock out in the second round.

Larsen faced Jimmy Vienot on October 21, 2022, at ONE 162. He won the fight by unanimous decision.

Larsen is scheduled to face Eddie Abasolo on March 25, 2023, at ONE Fight Night 8.

Titles and accomplishments
World Boxing Council Muay Thai
 2021 WBC Muay Thai World Super Welterweight Champion
International Muaythai Council
 2020 IMC World Super Welterweight Champion
World Kickboxing Union
 2013 WKU Muay Thai World Middleweight Champion
International Federation of Muaythai Associations
 2022 IFMA European Championships -75 kg

Fight record

|-  style="background:#;"
| 2023-03-25||   ||align=left| Eddie Abasolo ||  ONE Fight Night 8 || Kallang, Singapore ||   ||   || 
|-  style="background:#fbb;"
| 2022-10-21 || Loss ||align=left| Jimmy Vienot || ONE 162 || Kuala Lumpur, Malaysia || Decision (unanimous) || 3 || 3:00  
|-  style="background:#fbb;"
| 2022-06-03|| Loss ||align=left| Tawanchai P.K. Saenchaimuaythaigym || ONE 158 || Kallang, Singapore || KO (Left cross) || 2 || 1:42

|- style="background:#cfc;"
| 2021-12-11|| Win ||align=left| Valentin Thibaut || Extreme Muay Thai || Køge, Denmark || Decision (Unanimous) || 5 || 3:00 
|-
! style=background:white colspan=9 |

|- style="background:#fbb;"
| 2021-07-17|| Loss ||align=left| Youssef Boughanem || PSM Fight Night || Brussels, Belgium || Decision (Unanimous) || 5 || 3:00 
|-
! style=background:white colspan=9 |

|- style="background:#cfc;"
| 2020-12-12|| Win ||align=left| Carsten Ringler || Day of Destruction 14 || Hamburg, Germany || KO (Elbow) || 3 || 
|-
! style=background:white colspan=9 |

|-  bgcolor="#cfc"
|  2019-09-14 || Win || align="left" | Liu Hainan || Kunlun Fight 83 ||Zunyi, China||Decision (Unanimous) ||3|| 3:00

|-  style="background:#fbb;"
| 2019-01-27 || Loss ||align=left| Buakaw Banchamek || All Star Fight 7 || Phuket, Thailand || TKO (Referee stoppage) || 3 ||

|-  bgcolor="#fbb"
|  2018-08-05 || Loss|| align="left" | Marouan Toutouh || Kunlun Fight 75 1/8 Finals ||Sanya, China||Decision (Unanimous) ||3|| 3:00

|-  style="background:#fbb;"
| 2018-05-21|| Loss ||align=left| Petchtanong Banchamek || All Star Fight 4 || Hong Kong || Decision (Unanimous) || 3 || 3:00

|-  bgcolor="#cfc"
|  2018-04-01 || Win|| align="left" | Tian Xin || Kunlun Fight 71, Final ||Qingdao, China|| Decision (Unanimous) ||3||3:00

|-  bgcolor="#cfc"
|  2018-04-01 || Win|| align="left" | Noppakao Siriluck || Kunlun Fight 71, Semi Finals ||Qingdao, China|| KO (Flying knee) ||2|| 2:47

|-  style="background:#fbb"
| 2017-12-09 || Loss ||align=left| Tyjani Beztati || Glory 49: Rotterdam, Semi Final  || Rotterdam, Netherlands || Decision (Unanimous) || 3 || 3:00

|-  bgcolor="#cfc"
| 2017-09-02 || Win ||align=left| James Lemarié || Mikenta Fight Night || Denmark || TKO || 2 ||

|- style="background:#fbb;"
| 2017-06-10 || Loss ||align=left| Massaro Glunder || Glory 42: Paris || Paris, France || TKO (2 knockdowns) || 1 || 2:18

|-  bgcolor="#cfc"
| 2017-04-29 || Win ||align=left| Yodkhunpon Sitmonchai || Glory 40: Copenhagen || Copenhagen, Denmark || Decision (unanimous) || 3 || 3:00

|- style="background:#cfc;"
|2017-02-24
|Win
| align="left" | Lukasz Plawecki
|Glory 38: Chicago
|Chicago, USA
|Decision (Unanimous)
|3
|3:00

|-  style="background:#c5d2ea;"
| 2016-02-27 || Draw ||align=left| Andrej Bruhl || Mikenta Fight Night || Albertslund, Denmark || Decision || 3|| 3:00

|-  style="background:#fbb;"
| 2014-12-20 || Loss ||align=left| Khayal Dzhaniev || Top King World Series, Tournament Quarter Final || Hong Kong || Decision || 3|| 3:00

|-  style="background:#cfc;"
| 2014-11-15 || Win ||align=left| Vladimir Konsky || Top King World Series, Tournament 1/8 Final || France || KO (Punch) ||1||

|- style="background:#cfc;"
| 2014-09-08|| Win ||align=left| Edgar Freimanis || Fight Arena 29 || Denmark || KO (Knees) || 1 || 3:00 
|-
! style=background:white colspan=9 |

|- style="background:#cfc;"
| 2014-05-03|| Win ||align=left| Cedric Bacuna || Fight Arena 28 || Denmark || TKO (Doctor stopapge) || 1 ||

|-  style="background:#cfc;"
| 2014-04-12 || Win ||align=left| Steve Moxon || Glory 15: Istanbul || Istanbul, Turkey || TKO (punches) || 2 || 1:33

|-  bgcolor="#fbb"
| 2013-09-28 || Loss ||align=left| Andy Ristie || Glory 10: Los Angeles || Ontario, California, USA || Decision (unanimous) || 3 || 3:00

|- style="background:#cfc;"
| 2013-09-14|| Win ||align=left| Ulli Schick || Fight Arena 26 || Denmark || KO (Jumping knee) || 1 ||

|- style="background:#cfc;"
| 2013-05-19|| Win ||align=left| Yassine Cherkaoui || Fight Arena 25 || Denmark || TKO (Docor stoppage) || 2 ||

|- style="background:#cfc;"
| 2013-04-27|| Win ||align=left| Leo Bönniger || The Champions Club 10 || Bamberg, Germany || Decision || 5 ||3:00  
|-
! style=background:white colspan=9 |

|- style="background:#cfc;"
| 2013-04-10|| Win ||align=left| Umar Quandt || Fight Arena 24|| Denmark || Decision || 5 || 3:00

|- style="background:#cfc;"
| 2013-|| Win ||align=left| Sahil Siraj  || Fight Arena 23 || Denmark || Decision || 5 || 2:00

|- style="background:#cfc;"
| 2012-10-20|| Win ||align=left| Alexsandr Skrejvers || Fight Arena 22|| Albertslund, Denmark || KO (Knees)|| 3 ||

|- style="background:#fbb;"
| 2011-10-15|| Loss ||align=left| Walid Haddad || TK2 World Max 2011: Fight Code Final 8 || Aix-en-Provence, France || Decision || 3 || 3:00

|- style="background:#cfc;"
| 2011-06-11|| Win ||align=left| Vahit Arslan || Bodyattack Cup, Final || Hamburg, Germany || TKO|| ||

|- style="background:#cfc;"
| 2011-06-11|| Win ||align=left| Eyevan Danenberg || Bodyattack Cup, Semi Final || Hamburg, Germany || KO (Right cross)|| ||

|- style="background:#cfc;"
| 2011-06-11|| Win ||align=left| Florian Schöpp || Bodyattack Cup, Quarter Final || Hamburg, Germany || KO (Left hook)|| 1 ||

|- style="background:#cfc;"
| 2011-03-26|| Win ||align=left| Akapop Perrys Gym || Ring Fight Arena|| Sweden || Decision|| 5 ||2:00

|- style="background:#cfc;"
| 2010-09-25|| Win ||align=left| Akapop Perrys Gym || Fight Arena 20|| Albertslund, Denmark || TKO (Doctor stoppage)|| 2 ||

|- style="background:#cfc;"
| 2010-02-|| Win ||align=left| Anghel Cardos || Rising Starz 2|| Denmark || Decision|| 5 ||2:00

|-
| colspan=9 | Legend:    

|-  bgcolor="#FFBBBB"
| 2022-02-19 || Loss ||align=left| Oliver-Mathias Kongsgård Hansen || 2022 IFMA European Championship, Semi Final|| Istanbul, Turkey || Decision (29:28) || 3 || 3:00
|-
! style=background:white colspan=9 |

|-  bgcolor="#cfc"
| 2022-02-17 || Win ||align=left| Nayanesh Ayman || 2022 IFMA European Championship, Quarter Final|| Istanbul, Turkey || Decision (30:27) || 3 || 3:00

|-  bgcolor="#cfc"
| 2022-02-14 || Win ||align=left| Milos Petrovic || 2022 IFMA European Championship, First Round|| Istanbul, Turkey || TKO (Referee stoppage) || 1 ||

|-  bgcolor="#fbb"
| 2012-09-10 || Loss||align=left| Zaynalabid Magomedov Gablitdinovich || 2012 IFMA World Championships, Quarter Finals|| Saint Petersburg, Russia ||  ||  ||

|-  bgcolor="#cfc"
| 2012-09-08 || Win ||align=left| Peter Arbeau || 2012 IFMA World Championships, First Round|| Saint Petersburg, Russia ||  ||  ||

|-  bgcolor="#cfc"
| 2012-04- || Win ||align=left| Ricardo Gonzales || 2012 IFMA European Championships, 1/8 Finals || Antalya, Turkey ||  ||  ||

|-  bgcolor="#cfc"
| 2011-02-05 || Win ||align=left| Michael Strom|| 2011 Danish Muay Thai Championship, Final || Denmark || KO (Punches) || 1 || 
|-
! style=background:white colspan=9 |

|-  bgcolor="#cfc"
| 2011-02-05 || Win ||align=left| Rabie Jradi|| 2011 Danish Muay Thai Championship, Semi Final || Denmark || Decision || 2 || 3:00

|-  bgcolor="#cfc"
| 2010-02-06 || Win ||align=left| Morten Pedersen|| 2010 Danish Muay Thai Championship, Final || Denmark || TKO (Doctor stoppage) || 2 || 
|-
! style=background:white colspan=9 |
|-
| colspan=9 | Legend:

References

Niclas Larsen
Niclas Larsen
Glory kickboxers
Kunlun Fight kickboxers
ONE Championship kickboxers
1989 births
Living people